Lake Forest is a city in Orange County, California. The population was 85,858 at the 2020 census.

Lake Forest incorporated as a city on December 20, 1991. Prior to incorporation, the community had been known as El Toro. Following a vote in 2000, Lake Forest expanded its city limits to include the master-planned developments of Foothill Ranch and Portola Hills. This expansion brought new homes and commercial centers to the northeastern boundary of the city.

Lake Forest has two lakes from which the city gets its name. The lakes are man-made, and condominiums and custom homes ranging from large to small line their shores. Neighborhood associations manage the lakes (Lake 1, known as the Lake Forest Beach and Tennis Club, and Lake 2, the Sun and Sail Club.) Each facility features tennis courts, gyms, basketball courts, barbecue pits, volleyball courts, multiple swimming pools, saunas, hot tubs and club houses for social events.

The "forest" for which the city is also named lies in the area between Ridge Route, Jeronimo, Lake Forest and Serrano roads, and consists mostly of Eucalyptus trees. It is also man-made, and was created in the first decade of the 1900s when a local landowner, Dwight Whiting, planted  of Eucalyptus groves in the vicinity of Serrano Creek as part of a lumber operation intended to draw development to the area. In the late 1960s, the Occidental Petroleum company developed a residential community in and around the Eucalyptus groves, which had long since expanded and grown much more dense.

History

From 1863, the community had been known as El Toro. In 1874 José Serrano and his family occupied eleven thousand acres of ranch that had been granted to them by the Government of Mexico, and that eventually reached the hands of Dwight Whiting. Whiting was instrumental in bringing the Santa Fe rail line through the region. The Rancho Niguel was granted to Juan B. Alvarado, Juan Avila and his sister Conception, the widow of one Pedro Sánchez. From them it passed to other owners and was divided into plots, including Yorba. In 1874, most of it was owned by Cyrus B. Rawson. Jonathan E. Bacon also owned 1600 acres. In addition to the Serranos, established in Aliso Canyon, there was a group of pioneers who lived in the foothills and several miles above El Toro, many of whom were among the first settlers of this neighborhood.

El Toro Road at the I-5 Freeway was the epicenter of the Saddleback Valley from the late 19th century to the end of the 2nd millennium. However, the area gradually deteriorated, and most of the shops closed or moved to other cities. After years of planning, the city has worked with the property owners of some aging strip malls and developed the "Arbor at Lake Forest" commercial district. The new center now competes with large shopping centers in cities that surround Lake Forest.

In 1991, residents chose to incorporate, and chose the name "Lake Forest" in a referendum. Controversy ensued for months, as residents of the newer subdivisions arguing that "Lake Forest" sounded better than "El Toro", while long-time residents complained that the name change aimed to erase the town's history in favor of an artificial name that referred to man-made lakes. El Toro High School kept its name and continues to do so to this day. In subsequent years as the city came to be referred to as Lake Forest, mentions of "El Toro" in the press usually referred to the Marine Corps Air Station El Toro, decommissioned in 1999 and later repurposed.

Geography

Lake Forest is bordered by Irvine on the west and northwest, Laguna Hills and Laguna Woods on the southwest, Mission Viejo on the southeast, Trabuco Canyon and Silverado Canyon on the east, and Limestone Canyon Regional Park on the north.

Lake Forest is located in the heart of the Saddleback Valley, the north-east end located in the Foothills of the Santa Ana Mountains. It is also in the northern section of South Orange County.

It has two man-made lakes identified by the clubhouses on the lakes — the Beach and Tennis Club (Hidden Lakes, formerly Lake I) and the Sun and Sail Club (Lake II).

Infrastructure

Transportation

Highways
 Interstate 5 travels along the western border of Lake Forest, forming the border with Laguna Hills. I-5 has two interchanges in the city: Lake Forest Drive and El Toro Road (Highway S18).

 California State Route 241 passes through the Foothill Ranch community of Lake Forest, in close proximity to several residential and commercial areas. SR 241 has three interchanges in Lake Forest: Alton Parkway, Lake Forest Drive (a partial interchange with a southbound exit and northbound entrance only), and Portola Parkway.

 County Route S18, also known as El Toro Road, is a major road in Lake Forest, traveling the entire length and width of the city limits, about 10.5 miles. El Toro road has 8 major intersections in the city and passes through numerous communities, such as Portola Hills. At Live Oak Canyon Road, El Toro becomes Santiago Canyon Road, forming the far northeast boundary of Lake Forest, before heading through the mountains and becoming Chapman Avenue in northern Orange County.

Demographics

2020
The 2020 United States Census reported a population of 85,858. The racial makeup was 63.3% White, 2.2% African American, 18.1% Asian, and 23.2% Hispanic or Latino of any race.

2010
The 2010 United States Census reported that Lake Forest had a population of 77,264. The racial makeup of Lake Forest was 54,341 (70.3%) White (57.2% Non-Hispanic White), 1,295 (1.7%) African American, 384 (0.5%) Native American, 10,115 (13.1%) Asian, 191 (0.2%) Pacific Islander, 7,267 (9.4%) from other races, and 3,671 (4.8%) from two or more races. Hispanic or Latino of any race were 19,024 persons (24.6%).

The Census reported that 76,749 people (99.3% of the population) lived in households, 299 (0.4%) lived in non-institutionalized group quarters, and 216 (0.3%) were institutionalized.

There were 26,224 households, out of which 10,407 (39.7%) had children under the age of 18 living in them, 15,603 (59.5%) were married couples, 2,710 (10.3%) had a female householder with no husband present, 1,299 (5.0%) had a male householder with no wife present.  There were 1,217 (4.6%) unmarried partnerships, and 201 (0.8%)same-sex couples. 4,883 households (18.6%) were made up of individuals, and 1,432 (5.5%) had someone living alone who was 65 years of age or older. The average household size was 2.93.  There were 19,612 families (74.8% of all households); the average family size was 3.30.

The population was spread out, with 19,115 people (24.7%) under the age of 18, 6,775 people (8.8%) aged 18 to 24, 22,099 people (28.6%) aged 25 to 44, 22,184 people (28.7%) aged 45 to 64, and 7,091 people (9.2%) who were 65 years of age or older.  The median age was 37.2 years. For every 100 females, there were 98.7 males.  For every 100 females age 18 and over, there were 96.5 males.

The homeowner vacancy rate was 1.3%; the rental vacancy rate was 4.3%.  54,082 people (70.0% of the population) lived in owner-occupied housing units and 22,667 people (29.3%) lived in rental housing units.

2000
As of the census of 2000, there were 58,707 people, 20,008 households, and 14,745 families residing in the city. The population density was 4,698.8 inhabitants per square mile (1,814.8/km2). The racial makeup of the city was 76.02% White, 1.83% African American, 0.50% Native American, 9.70% Asian, 0.20% Pacific Islander, 7.51% from other races, and 4.24% from two or more races. Hispanic or Latino of any race were 18.59% of the population.

There were 20,008 households, out of which 39.2% had children under the age of 18 living with them, 59.1% were married couples living together, 10.3% had a female householder with no husband present, and 26.3% were non-families. 19.4% of all households were made up of individuals, and 5.1% had someone living alone who was 65 years of age or older. The average household size was 2.89 and the average family size was 3.31.

In the city, the population was spread out, with 27.0% under the age of 18, 8.0% from 18 to 24, 33.3% from 25 to 44, 23.2% from 45 to 64, and 8.6% who were 65 years of age or older. The median age was 35 years. For every 100 females, there were 96.7 males. For every 100 females age 18 and over, there were 93.6 males.

According to a 2007 estimate, the median income for a household in the city was $86,285, and the median income for a family was $96,133. Males had a median income of $52,019 versus $37,100 for females. The per capita income for the city was $28,583. About 3.2% of families and 5.3% of the population were below the poverty line, including 5.0% of those under age 18 and 4.4% of those age 65 or over.

Economy
The city is home to the headquarters of eyewear manufacturer Oakley, Inc.; metals company Kaiser Aluminum, in-flight entertainment provider Panasonic Avionics; Karem Aircraft an aircraft company developing UAV's with major aircraft companies; telecommunications software developer Greenlight Wireless Corp.; barbecue retailer Barbeques Galore; restaurant chains Johnny Rockets and Del Taco; medical equipment maker Apria Healthcare; and skateboarding companies Sole Technology, Inc., Etnies, Autism Behavior Services Inc., and Tilly's;  among others. It is also the home of the corporate headquarters for Eagle Community Credit Union, a credit union focused on serving postal and federal employees who live or work in Orange County.

Top employers
According to the City's 2020 Comprehensive Annual Financial Report, the top employers in the city are:

Arts and culture
Lake Forest is served by two branches of the Orange County Public Library system known as OC Public Libraries: the El Toro branch and the Foothill Ranch branch.

The city is the location of Rick Warren's megachurch, Saddleback Church, the sixth-largest evangelical church in the United States.

The city of Lake Forest puts on an annual summer concert at Pittsford Park. Other public events include the Fourth of July 5K run and fireworks display over the lake at the Sun & Sail Club.
On Wednesdays at 4 pm, there is a farmers market at the Sports Park and Recreation Center, where locals can go and buy products from the local farmers and vendors.

In 2020, the classical music organization Chamber Music | OC moved its operations from Chapman University in Orange, California to the Lake Forest Business Center where they are headquartered.

Parks and recreation
Lake Forest Sports Park and Recreation Center opened on November 1, 2014, across the street from Saddleback Church. The 86.2-acre Sports Park, built with fees collected from developers for a "study" that led to the rezoning of surrounding areas, is one of the largest sports parks in Orange County. The Recreation Center houses classrooms/activities rooms and a gymnasium, hosting many education and recreation programs that have previously been hosted at the rented City Hall facility.

Lake Forest is also home to two county parks. Whiting Ranch Wilderness Park in the eastern part of the city was the site of an infamous mountain lion mauling in 2004 that captured the attention of the West Coast news media.

Heritage Hill Historical Park and Museum is home to some of the oldest buildings in Orange County, including the Jose Serrano Adobe, an original adobe home and settlement built in 1863; El Toro's first school, the old El Toro School House; El Toro's first church, St. Georges Episcopal Church; and the Harvey Bennett Ranch House, built in 1908, from which the Bennett Ranch development in Lake Forest derives its name. The Bennetts raised oranges for Sunkist, and owned the State-deeded water rights to Aliso Creek, which was very rare in California, and instrumental to their success. It is also the location of "Ritchie's Park," per signs along Aliso Creek, which was a naturally set childhood playground along the stream, where all of the Bennett children and grandchildren played. Frequently, the children found Indian artifacts along the banks, and met relatives of the Indians whose ancestors had actually lived there, including "Al" and "Cy" who were older Indians working for the Bennetts. The park is named for Richard Bennett Harvey, the grandchild whom Harvey and Frances Bennett raised, their seventh and last "child" who grew up on the ranch in youth, and lived there later in early marriage, working on the ranch until it was sold. The Bennett's son, Richard Beach Bennett, was educated in Animal Husbandry at California Polytechnic State University, Pomona, and grew replacement trees for farmers, before starting his own ranch in Balcom Canyon in Ventura County.

Government

Marine Corps Air Station El Toro was located one mile (1.6 km) from the city of Lake Forest in the city of Irvine. At one time, El Toro was considered a military town, but the city blossomed independently in the 1980s and 1990s before the base closed in 1999.

Doug Cirbo serves as Lake Forest's Mayor and Mark Tettemer serves as Mayor Pro Tempore. In addition to Cirbo and Tettemer, the three other City Council members are Robert Pequeno, Scott Voigts, and Benjamin Yu.

State and federal representation

In the United States House of Representatives, Lake Forest is in ,.

According to the Secretary of State of California, as of February 10, 2019, Lake Forest has 46,014 registered voters. Of those, 17,329 (37.66%) are registered Republicans, 13,402 (29.13%) are registered Democrats, and 13,080 (28.43%) have no political party preference/are independents.

Historically, Lake Forest has, like most of southern Orange County, been a Republican fortress in presidential elections. Changing demographics and the intensely polarizing urban/rural divide, however, has made Lake Forest more fertile footing for Democrats, who in recent elections have been trimming the GOP margins in the city. In 2020, Joe Biden became the first Democratic presidential nominee to win Lake Forest since its incorporation.

Education
Lake Forest has one high school, El Toro High School, which opened in 1973, and one high school on the border of Lake Forest and Mission Viejo, Trabuco Hills High School. The city also has eight elementary schools and a middle school. The mascot is a bull and its teams are known as the Chargers; its school colors are blue and gold. Lake Forest is served entirely by the Saddleback Valley Unified School District, or SVUSD.

Notable people

Nolan Arenado, MLB All-Star, St. Louis Cardinals
Brad Bufanda, actor
Lauren Chamberlain, professional softball player for USSSA Pride, holds record for most career home runs in NCAA
Matt Chapman (baseball), MLB player, Oakland Athletics
Jake Ellenberger, UFC fighter in welterweight division
Ekaterina Gordeeva, 1988 and 1994 Olympic gold medalist in pair skating (married to Ilia Kulik)
HORSE the Band, hardcore music act
Ilia Kulik, 1998 Olympic gold medalist in men's single skating (married to Ekaterina Gordeeva)
Ryan Lasch, ice hockey player
Mark Muñoz, UFC fighter in middleweight division
Eddie Paskey, "Lieutenant Leslie" from Star Trek: The Original Series
Brandi Passante, TV personality
Ginger Reyes, rock bassist with the bands The Smashing Pumpkins and Halo Friendlies
Austin Romine, catcher for El Toro High School's baseball team, drafted by New York Yankees in 2007
Kaitlin Sandeno, Olympic swimming champion, El Toro High School grad
Lindsay Soto, football broadcaster
Christine Woods, actress in ABC television show FlashForward
Elaine Youngs, Olympic volleyball champion

Former
Florence Griffith Joyner – athlete, Olympic gold medalist, laid to rest at El Toro Memorial Park.
Diane Murphy - actress on Bewitched - El Toro High School graduate. 
Erin Murphy - actress on Bewitched - El Toro High School graduate.
Nicole Brown Simpson - deceased former wife of O. J. Simpson, laid to rest at Ascension Cemetery.
Jonathan Thulin - contemporary Christian singer and recording artist.

References

External links

 
 Chamber of Commerce Homepage
Early history of El Toro: El Toro and Its History, Charlotte Moulton, 1932, Orange County History Series, Volume 2

 
1991 establishments in California
Cities in Orange County, California
Incorporated cities and towns in California
Populated places established in 1991